The following is an incomplete list of musical pieces that belong to the category, Sonata.

Baroque (ca 1600 – ca 1760) 

 Marc-Antoine Charpentier
 Sonata for 8 H 548 (date unknown)
 Johann Sebastian Bach
 Sonatas for solo violin (BWV 1001, 1003 and 1005)
 Sonatas for flute and continuo (BWV 1034, 1035)
 Trio sonatas: for organ (BWV 525–530); for violin and harpsichord (BWV 1014–1019); for viola da gamba and harpsichord (BWV 1027–1029); for flute and harpsichord (BWV 1030, 1032); for flute, violin and continuo (Sonata sopr'il Soggetto Realeincluded in The Musical Offering)
 Heinrich Ignaz Franz Biber
 Rosary Sonatas
 George Frideric Handel
 Sonata for Violin and Continuo in D Major (HWV 371)
 Élisabeth Jacquet de La Guerre
 Sonatas (2), for violin, viola da gamba, and basso continuo (c. 1695)
 Sonatas (6), for violin and basso continuo (1707)
 Giuseppe Tartini
 Devil's Trill Sonata
 Arcangelo Corelli
 Trio Sonatas op. 1–4
 Domenico Scarlatti
 Keyboard sonata in E major L. 23
 Keyboard sonata in B minor L. 33
 Keyboard sonata in C major L. 104
 Keyboard sonata in F minor L. 118
 Keyboard sonata in A minor L. 241
 Keyboard sonata in D minor L. 266
 Keyboard sonata in G major L. 349
 Keyboard sonata in C minor L. 352
 Keyboard sonata in D minor L. 422
 Keyboard sonata in B minore L. 449
 Keyboard sonata in A major L. 483
Complete list
 Pietro Domenico Paradisi
 Keyboard sonata in A major
 Jean-Féry Rebel
 12 sonates à 2 ou 3 parties, Book of twelve sonatas in 2 or 3 parts (composed in 1695, published in Paris in 1712)
 12 Sonates à violon seul mellées de plusieurs récits pour la viole, 12 sonatas for violin solo mixed with récits for viol, (Paris 1713)
 Jean-Marie Leclair
 Op. 1 No. 1 – Violin Sonata in A minor
 Op. 1 No. 2 – Violin Sonata in C major
 Op. 1 No. 3 – Violin Sonata in B flat major
 Op. 1 No. 4 – Violin Sonata in D major
 Op. 1 No. 5 – Violin Sonata in G major
 Op. 1 No. 6 – Violin Sonata in E minor
 Op. 1 No. 7 – Violin Sonata in F major
 Op. 1 No. 8 – Violin Sonata in G major
 Op.1 No. 9 – Violin Sonata in A major
 Op. 1 No. 10 – Violin Sonata in D major
 Op. 1 No. 11 – Violin Sonata in B flat major
 Op. 1 No. 12 – Violin Sonata in B minor
 Op. 2 No. 1 – Violin Sonata in E minor
 Op 2 No. 2 – Violin Sonata in F major
 Op. 2 No. 3 – Violin Sonata in C major
 Op. 2 No. 4 – Violin Sonata in A major
 Op. 2 No. 5 – Violin Sonata in G major
 Op. 2 No. 6 – Violin Sonata in D major
 Op. 2 No. 7 – Violin Sonata in B flat major
 Op. 2 No. 8 – Violin Sonata in D major
 Op. 2 No. 9 – Violin Sonata in E major
 Op. 2 No. 10 – Violin Sonata in C minor
 Op. 2 No. 11 – Violin Sonata in B minor
 Op. 2 No. 12 – Violin Sonata in G minor
 Op. 3 No. 1 – Sonata for 2 violins in G major
 Op. 3 No. 2 – Sonata for 2 violins in A major
 Op. 3 No. 3 – Sonata for 2 violins in C major
 Op. 3 No. 4 – Sonata for 2 violins in F major
 Op. 3 No. 5 – Sonata for 2 violins in E minor
 Op. 3 No. 6 – Sonata for 2 violins in D major
 Op. 5 No. 1 – Violin Sonata in A major
 Op. 5 No. 2 – Violin Sonata in F major
 Op. 5 No. 3 – Violin Sonata in E minor
 Op. 5 No. 4 – Violin Sonata in B flat major
 Op. 5 No. 5 – Violin Sonata in B minor
 Op. 5 No. 6 – Violin Sonata in C minor
 Op. 5 No. 7 – Violin Sonata in A minor
 Op. 5 No. 8 – Violin Sonata in D major
 Op. 5 No. 9 – Violin Sonata in E major
 Op. 5 No. 10 – Violin Sonata in C major
 Op. 5 No. 11 – Violin Sonata in G minor
 Op. 5 No. 12 – Violin Sonata in G major
 Op. 9 No. 1 – Violin Sonata in A major
 Op. 9 No. 2 – Violin Sonata in E minor
 Op. 9 No. 3 – Violin Sonata in D major
 Op. 9 No. 4 – Violin Sonata in A major
 Op. 9 No. 5 – Violin Sonata in A minor
 Op. 9 No. 6 – Violin Sonata in D major
 Op. 9 No. 7 – Violin Sonata in G major
 Op. 9 No. 8 – Violin Sonata in C major
 Op. 9 No. 9 – Violin Sonata in E flat major
 Op. 9 No. 10 – Violin Sonata in F sharp minor
 Op. 9 No. 11 – Violin Sonata in G minor
 Op. 9 No. 12 – Violin Sonata in G major

Classical (ca 1760 – ca 1830) 

Haydn
Sonata in C major (H. XVI:3 / WU 14) (c1765)
Sonata in D major (H. XVI:19 / WU 30) (1767)
Sonata in C minor (H. XVI:20 / WU 33) (1771)
Sonata in F major (H. XVI:23 / WU 38) (1773)
Sonata in B minor (H. XVI:32 / WU 47) (before 1776)
Sonata in E minor (H. XVI:34 / WU 53) (before 1784)
Sonata in G major (H. XVI:40 / WU 54) (before 1784)
Sonata in A major (H. XVI:46) (1771)
Sonata in C major (H. XVI:48 / WU 58) (1789)
Sonata in C major (H. XVI:50 / WU 60) (c1794/5)
Sonata in E major (H. XVI:52 / WU 62) (1794)
Chevalier de Saint-Georges
Three Sonatas for keyboard with violin: B flat, A, and G minor, Op. 1a (c1770)
Sonata for harp with flute obligato, in E major
Sonata for harpsichord with violin obligato, in G major
Six Sonatas for violin accompanied by a second violin: B flat, E flat, A, G, B flat, A: Op. posth. Pleyel (1800)
 Cello Sonata, lost, mentioned by a review in the Gazette du departement du Nord, April 10, 1792.
Salieri
Piano Sonata in C major (?1783)
Boccherini
Six Sonatas for violin and continuo, Op. 5 (1768)
Six Sonatas for cello and continuo (1770)
At least seventeen more sonatas for cello and continuo
Sonata for two cellos in C major
Sonata for two cellos in E major
 Leopold Mozart
Piano Sonata in F major, S. 1.1 (1759)
Piano Sonata in B major, S 1.2 (1760)
Piano Sonata in C, S. 1.3 (1759 or earlier)
 Wolfgang Amadeus Mozart
 Piano Sonata in E major (K. 282/189f – see Köchel-Verzeichnis) – Has an unusual adagio as the first movement.
 Piano Sonata in A major (K. 331/300i)
 Piano Sonata in B major (K. 333/315c)
 Piano Sonata in C major (K. 545)
 Piano Sonata in B major (K.570) – Considered by many to be Mozart's finest piano sonata
Franz Xaver Wolfgang Mozart
Sonata No. 1 for violin and piano in  B major, Op. 7 (1808)
Sonata No. 2 for violin and piano in F major, Op.15 (1813)
Grande sonate for violin or cello and piano in E major, Op.19 (1820)
Rondo (Sonata) for flute and piano
Sonata for piano, Op. 10 (1808)
Clementi
Sonata, Op. 2,  No. 1
Sonata in B, Op. 12, No.1
Sonata in E, Op. 12, No.2
Sonata in E, Op. 12, No.4
Sonata in F minor, Op. 13, No. 2
Sonata in B major, Op. 24, No. 2 – The melody from this sonata was used by Mozart in his "Magic Flute" Overture.
Sonata in E, Op. 24, No.3
Sonata in G, Op. 25, No.2
Sonata in F, Op. 26, No.2
Sonata in D, Op. 26, No.3
Sonata in C, Op. 34, No.1
Sonata, Op. 36, No. 1
Sonata, Op. 36, No. 2
Sonata, Op. 36, No. 3
Sonata in G, Op. 37, No. 2
Sonata, Op. 40, No. 1
Sonata, Op. 40, No. 2
Sonata, Op. 40, No. 3
Sonata, Op. 47, No. 2
Sonata, Op. 50, No. 1
Sonata, Op. 50, No. 2
Sonata, Op. 50, No. 3
Dussek
Sonata in C minor, Op. 35, No. 3, C. 151
Sonata F minor, Elégie harmonique, Op. 61, C. 211
Sonata in A major, Le Retour à Paris Op. 64, C. 221
 Beethoven
 Sonata No. 2 for Cello and Piano, Op. 5, No. 2, in G Minor
 Piano Sonata No. 1, Op. 2, No. 1
 Piano Sonata No. 2, Op. 2, No. 2
 Piano Sonata No. 3, Op. 2, No. 3
 Piano Sonata No. 4, Op. 7
 Piano Sonata No. 5, Op. 10, No. 1
 Piano Sonata No. 6, Op. 10, No. 2
 Piano Sonata No. 7, Op. 10, No. 3
 Piano Sonata No. 8, Op. 13 "Pathétique"
 Piano Sonata No. 9, Op. 14, No. 1
 Piano Sonata No. 10, Op. 14, No. 2
 Piano Sonata No. 11, Op. 22
 Piano Sonata No. 12, Op. 26 "Funeral March"
 Piano Sonata No. 13, Op. 27, No. 1 "Sonata quasi una Fantasia"
 Piano Sonata No. 14, Op. 27, No. 2 "Moonlight"
 Piano Sonata No. 15, Op. 28 "Pastoral"
 Piano Sonata No. 16, Op. 31, No. 1
 Piano Sonata No. 17, Op. 31, No. 2 "Tempest"
 Piano Sonata No. 18, Op. 31, No. 3 "The Hunt"
 Piano Sonata No. 19, Op. 49, No. 1 (easy sonata)
 Piano Sonata No. 20, Op. 49, No. 2 (easy sonata)
 Piano Sonata No. 21, Op. 53 "Waldstein"
 Piano Sonata No. 22, Op. 54
 Piano Sonata No. 23, Op. 57 "Appassionata"
 Piano Sonata No. 24, Op. 78
 Piano Sonata No. 25, Op. 79
 Piano Sonata No. 26, Op. 81a "Les adieux"
 Piano Sonata No. 27, Op. 90
 Piano Sonata No. 28, Op. 101
 Piano Sonata No. 29, Op. 106 "Hammerklavier"
 Piano Sonata No. 30, Op. 109
 Piano Sonata No. 31, Op. 110
 Piano Sonata No. 32, Op. 111
 Sonata for Violin and Piano in D major, op. 12, no. 1
 Violin Sonata "Spring"
 Violin Sonata "Kreutzer"
 Horn Sonata, Op. 17
 Flute Sonata, Anh. 4
Danzi
Horn Sonata, Op. 28
Horn Sonata, Op. 44
Basset Horn Sonata, Op. 62
Pietro Denis
 Sonata for mandolin & continuo No. 1 in D major
 Sonata No. 3 for mandolin
Alexandro Marie Antoin Fridzeri
 Six sonatas for the mandolin, Op. 3, published 1771, Paris
 Franz Schubert (see also Sonatas, duos and fantasies by Franz Schubert),
 Sonata in F major for piano duet, D 1C
 Sonata movement (Sonatensatz) in B-flat major for Piano Trio, D 28
 Piano Sonata in E major, D 157
 Piano Sonata in C major, D 279
 Sonat(in)as for violin and piano, Op. 137: in D major, D 384 – in A minor, D 385 – in G minor, D 408
 Piano Sonata in E major, D 459
 Piano Sonata in A minor, D 537
 Piano Sonata in A-flat major, D 557
 Piano Sonata in E minor, D 566
 Piano Sonata in D-flat major, D 568
 Piano Sonata in E-flat major, D 568
 Piano Sonata in F-sharp minor, D 571
 Violin Sonata (Duo) in A major, D 574
 Piano Sonata in B major, D 575
 Piano Sonata in C major, D 613
 Sonata in B-flat major for piano four-hands, D 617
 Piano Sonata in F minor, D 625
 Piano Sonata in C-sharp minor, D 655
 Piano Sonata in A major, D 664
 Piano Sonata in E minor, D 769A
 Piano Sonata in A minor, D 784
 Sonata in C major for piano four-hands, D 812
 Arpeggione Sonata, D 821
 Piano Sonata in C major, D 840
 Piano Sonata in A minor, D 845
 Piano Sonata in D major, D 850
 Piano Sonata in G major, D 894
 Schubert's last sonatas: Piano Sonata in C minor, D 958 – Piano Sonata in A major, D 959 – Piano Sonata in B-flat major, D 960

Romantic (ca 1830 – ca 1900) 
 Robert Schumann
 Piano Sonata in F minor, Op. 11
 Piano Sonata in F minor, Op. 14
 Violin Sonata No. 1 in A minor, Op. 105
 Violin Sonata No. 2 in D minor, Op. 121
 Piano Sonata No. 2 in G minor, Op. 22
 Frédéric Chopin
 Piano Sonata No. 1 in C minor, Op. 4
 Piano Sonata No. 2 in B minor, Op. 35,
 Piano Sonata No. 3 in B minor, Op. 58
 Cello Sonata in G minor, Op. 65
 Felix Mendelssohn
 Sonata in E major, Op. 6
 Sonata in G minor, Op. 105
 Sonata in B major, Op. 106
 Cello Sonata in B, Op. 45
 Cello Sonata in D, Op. 58
 Six Sonatas for Organ, Op. 65
Fanny Mendelssohn
Easter Sonata
 Franz Liszt
 Sonata after a Reading of Dante (Fantasia Quasi Sonata)
 Sonata in B minor
  Julius Reubke
 Sonata in C minor, Psalm 94.
 Piano Sonata in B-flat minor
 Johannes Brahms
 Piano Sonata No. 1, Op. 1
 Piano Sonata No. 2, Op. 2
 Piano Sonata No. 3 in F minor, Op. 5
 Violin Sonata No. 1, Op. 78 "Rain Sonata"
 Violin Sonata No. 2, Op. 100
 Violin Sonata No. 3, Op. 108
 Cello Sonata No. 1, Op. 38
 Cello Sonata No. 2, Op. 99
 Clarinet Sonata No. 1, Op. 120/1
 Clarinet Sonata No. 2, Op. 120/2
César Cui
Sonata for Violin and Piano, Op. 84
Mily Balakirev
Two piano sonatas:
No. 1, in B-flat minor, Op. 5 (unfinished)
No. 2 in B-flat minor, Op. 102 (1905)
 Pyotr Ilyich Tchaikovsky
 Piano Sonata in G, Op. 37 "Grande Sonate"
 Sergei Rachmaninoff
 Cello Sonata in G minor
 Piano Sonata No. 1 in D minor
 Piano Sonata No. 2 in B minor
 César Franck
Violin Sonata in A (sometimes played on cello or flute)
 Edvard Grieg
 Piano Sonata, Op. 7
 Violin Sonata No. 1 in F major, Op. 8
 Violin Sonata No. 2 in G major, Op. 13
 Violin Sonata No. 3 in C minor, Op. 45
 Cello Sonata in A minor, Op. 36
 Camille Saint-Saëns
 Violin Sonata No. 1, Op. 75
 Violin Sonata No. 2, Op. 102
 Cello Sonata No. 1, Op. 32
 Cello Sonata No. 2, Op. 123
 Bassoon Sonata, Op. 168
 Clarinet Sonata, Op. 167
 Oboe Sonata in D major, Op. 166
 Gabriel Fauré
 Violin Sonata No. 1 (1875)
 Violin Sonata No. 2 (1916)
 Cello Sonata No. 1 (1917)
 Cello Sonata No. 2 (1921)
 Edward Elgar
 Organ Sonata in G major, Op. 28
 Violin Sonata, Op. 82
 Joseph Jongen
 Sonate Eroïca, Op. 94

20th century (including contemporary) (ca 1900–2011) 
 George Antheil
 "Airplane" Sonata
 Samuel Barber
 Cello Sonata
 Piano Sonata
 Jean Barraqué
 Piano Sonata (1950–52)
 Béla Bartók
 Piano Sonata
 Sonata for Solo Violin
 Sonata for Violin and Piano in E minor (1903)
 Sonata for Violin and Piano No. 1, op. 21 (1921)
 Sonata for Violin and Piano No. 2 (1922)
 Sonata for Two Pianos and Percussion (1938)
 Alban Berg
 Piano Sonata
 Leonard Bernstein
 Clarinet Sonata
 Pierre Boulez
 Piano Sonata No. 1
 Piano Sonata No. 2
 Piano Sonata No. 3
Frank Bridge
Piano Sonata
Sonata for cello and piano
Sonata for violin and piano
 Elliott Carter
 Piano Sonata
 Cello Sonata
 Carlos Chávez
Piano Sonata No. 1 (Sonata fantasía) (1918)
Piano Sonata No. 2 (1919)
Piano Sonata No. 3 (1928)
Piano Sonata No. 4 (1941)
Piano Sonata No. 5 (1960)
Piano Sonata No. 6 (1961)
Sonata for four horns (1929)
  Rebecca Clarke
 Sonata for Viola and Piano (1919)
 Aaron Copland
 Piano Sonata
 Violin Sonata (also arr. for clarinet and piano)
 John Corigliano
 Violin Sonata
 Claude Debussy
 Cello Sonata (Sonata No. 1)
 Sonata for Flute, Viola and Harp (Sonata No. 2)
 Violin Sonata (Sonata No. 3)
 Henri Dutilleux
 Piano Sonata
 George Enescu
Sonata No. 1 for cello and piano, in F minor, Opus 26, No. 1 (1898)
Sonata No. 2 for cello and piano, in C major, Opus 26, No. 2 (1935)
Piano Sonata No. 1, Op. 24, No. 1
Piano Sonata No. 3, Op. 24, No. 3
 Violin Sonata No. 1, Op. 2
 Violin Sonata No. 2 in F minor, Op. 6 (1899)
 Violin Sonata No. 3, Op. 25 "In Romanian Folk Style"
 Iván Erőd
 1st Violin Sonata Op. 14 (1969–79)
 2nd Violin Sonata Op. 74 (2000)  
 Alberto Ginastera
 Sonata No. 1 for Piano (1952)
 Sonata No. 2 for Piano (1981)
 Sonata No. 3 for Piano (1982)
 Sonata for Cello and Piano (1979)
 Sonata for Guitar (1976, rev. 1981)
 Karel Goeyvaerts
 Sonata for Two Pianos, Op. 1
 Otar Gordeli
 Piano Sonata (1960)
 Paul Hindemith
 Harp Sonata (1939)
 Piano Sonata, Op. 17 (1920)
 Piano Sonata No. 1 in A (1936)
 Piano Sonata No. 2 in G (1936)
 Piano Sonata No. 3 in B (1936)
 Sonata for Piano Four-Hands (1938)
 Sonata for Two Pianos (1942)
 Organ Sonata No. 1 (1937)
 Organ Sonata No. 2 (1937)
 Organ Sonata No. 3, "nach alten Volksliedern" (1940)
 Sonata for Flute and Piano (1936)
 Sonata for Oboe and Piano (1938)
 Sonata for English Horn and Piano (1941)
 Sonata for Clarinet and Piano (1939)
 Sonata for Bassoon and Piano (1938)
 Sonata for Alto Horn in E-flat and Piano
 Sonata for Horn in F and Piano (1939)
 Sonata for Four Horns (1952)
 Sonata for Trumpet and Piano
 Sonata for Trombone and Piano (1941)
 Sonata for Bass Tuba and Piano (1955)
 Sonata No. 1 for Violin Solo, Op. 11, No. 6, in G minor (1917)
 Sonata No. 2 for Violin Solo, Op. 31, No. 1 (1924)
 Sonata No. 3 for Violin Solo, "Es ist so schönes Wetter draussen", Op. 31, No. 2 (1924)
 Sonata No. 1 for Violin and Piano, Op. 11, No. 1, in E major (1918)
 Sonata No. 2 for Violin and Piano, Op. 11, No. 2, in D major (1918)
 Sonata No. 3 for Violin and Piano in E major (1935)
 Sonata No. 4 for Violin and Piano in C major (1939)
 Sonata No. 1 for Viola Solo, Op. 11, No. 5 (1919)
 Sonata No. 2 for Viola Solo, Op. 25, No. 1 (1922)
 Sonata No. 3 for Viola Solo, Op. 31, No. 4 (1923)
 Sonata No. 4 for Viola Solo (1937)
 Sonata No. 1 for Viola and Piano, Op. 11, No. 4 (1919)
 Sonata No. 2 for Viola and Piano, Op. 25, No. 4 (1922)
 Sonata No. 3 for Viola and Piano (1939)
 Kleine Sonata for Viola d'Amore and Piano, Op. 25, No. 2 (1922)
 Sonata for Cello Solo, Op. 25, No. 3 (1923)
 Sonata No. 1 for Cello and Piano, Op. 11, No. 3 (1919, rev. 1921)
 Sonata No. 2 for Cello and Piano (1948)
 Sonata for Double Bass and Piano (1949)
Herbert Howells
Two sonatas for organ
Sonatas for clarinet, oboe, and piano
 Charles Ives
 Sonata No. 2 for Piano: Concord, Mass., 1840–60
 Leoš Janáček
 Piano Sonata "1.X.1905"
 Violin Sonata
 Betsy Jolas
 Sonate à 8, for cello octet (1998)
 Vítězslava Kaprálová
 Sonata Appassionata, op. 6 for piano (1933)
Aram Khachaturian
Sonata for Violin and Piano (1932)
Sonata-Fantasia for unaccompanied cello (1974)
Sonata-Monologue for unaccompanied violin (1975)
Sonata-Song for solo viola (1976)
Piano Sonata (1961)
Tikhon Khrennikov
Sonata for Cello and piano, Op. 34 (1989)
 Zoltán Kodály
 Sonata for Solo Cello
 Ernst Krenek
Seven piano sonatas in different styles
 Claus Kühnl
Sonatas 1–10 (2005–2008) for Piano
 Dieter Lehnhoff
Hai-kai, Op. 24 (2001), sonata for piano
Sonata Urbana, Op. 30 (2010) for clarinet (or viola) and piano 
Sonata Porteña, Op. 35 (2013) for flute and piano
Bohuslav Martinů
 Flute Sonata No. 1
Nikolai Medtner
14 piano sonatas
No. 1 in F minor, Op. 5 (1901-3)
No. 2 in A, Op. 11 (1904-7)
No. 3 in D minor, Sonate-Elegie, Op. 11 (1904-7)
No. 4 in C, Op. 11 (1904-7)
No. 5 in G minor, Op. 22 (1909-10)
No. 6 in C minor, Sonata-Skazka, Op. 22 (1910-11)
No. 7 in E minor, Night Wind, Op. 22 (1910-11)
No. 8 in F, Sonata-Ballade, Op. 27 (1912-14)
No. 9 in A minor, War Sonata , Op. 30 (1914-17)
No. 10 in A minor, Sonata-reminiscenza, Op. 38 No. 1 (1920)
No. 11 in C minor, Sonata Tragica, Op. 39, No. 5 (1920)
No. 12 in B minor, Romantica, Op. 53 No. 1 (1930)
No. 13 in F minor, Minacciosa, Op. 53, No. 2 (1930)
No. 14 in G, Sonata-Idyll, Op. 56 (1937)
Violin Sonata No. 1 in B minor, Op. 21 (1909-10)
Violin Sonata No. 2 in G major, Op. 44 (1922-25)
Violin Sonata No. 3 in E minor, Epica, Op. 57 (1938)
Alexander Mosolov
Five piano sonatas
No. 1, Op. 3 (1924)
No. 2, Op. 4 (1923–24)
No. 3, Op. 6 (1924)
No. 4, Op. 11 (1925)
No. 5, Op. 12 (1925)
Sonata for Viola and Piano, Op. 21a
Sonata for Cello and Piano (1927)
Nikolai Myaskovsky
Two sonatas for cello and piano:
No. 1, in D major, Op. 12 (1911, rev. 1935)
No. 2, n A minor, Op. 81 (1948)
Sonata for Violin and Piano in F major, Op. 70 (1946) 
Nine piano sonatas:
No. 1 in D minor, Op. 6 (1907)
No. 2 in F-sharp minor, Op. 13 (1912)
No. 3 in C minor, Op. 19 (1920; second version 1939)
No. 4 in C minor, Op. 27 (1924; revised 1945)
No. 5 in B major, Op. 64, No. 1 (1944 revision of an early sonata from 1907)
No. 6 in A-flat major, Op. 64, No. 2 (1944 revision of an early sonata)
No. 7 in C major, Op. 82 (1948)
No. 8 in D minor, Op. 83 (1949)
No. 9 in F major, Op. 84 (1949)
Dora Pejačević
 Sonata in D Major, op. 26 for violin and piano (1909)
 Sonata in E Minor, op. 35 for violoncello and piano (1913)
 Sonata in B Minor, op.  36 (1914)
 Sonata in A flat Major, op. 57 for piano (1921)
 Vincent Persichetti
Sonata for Solo Violin, Op. 10 (1940)
Sonata for Solo Cello, Op. Op. 54 (1952)
Sonata for Organ, Op. 86 (1960)
 Twelve piano sonatas:
 No. 1, Op.3 (1939)
 No. 2, Op. 6 (1939)
 No. 3, Op. 22 (1943)
 No. 4, Op. 36 (1949)
 No. 5, Op. 37 (1949)
 No. 6, Op. 39 (1950)
 No. 7, Op. 40 (1950)
 No. 8, Op. 41 (1950)
 No. 9, Op. 58 (1952)
 No. 10, Op. 67 (1955)
 No. 11, Op. 101 (1965)
 Nine harpsichord sonatas:
No. 1, Op. 52 (1951)
No. 2, Op. 146 (1981) 
No. 3, Op. 149 (1981)
No. 4, Op. 151 (1982)
No. 5, Op. 152 (1982)
No. 6, Op. 154 (1982)
No. 7, Op. 156 (1983)
No. 8, Op. 158 (1984)
No. 9, Op. 163 (1985)
 No. 12, (Mirror Sonata) Op. 145 (1982)
 Walter Piston
Sonata for Piano (1926)
Sonata for Flute and Piano (1930)
Sonata for Violin and Piano (1939)
 Francis Poulenc
 Sonata for two clarinets, FP 7 (1918/1945)
 Sonata for clarinet and bassoon, FP 32 (1922/1945)
 Sonata for horn, trumpet and trombone, FP 33 (1922/1945)
 Violin Sonata, FP 119 (1942–43/1949)
 Cello Sonata, FP 143 (1940–48)
 Flute Sonata, FP 164 (1956–57)
 Clarinet Sonata, FP 184 (1962)
 Oboe Sonata, FP 185 (1962)
 Gerhard Präsent
 Sonata del Gesù for violin and piano Op.35 (1997–99)
 Sonata al dente for cello and piano Op.23 (1988–90)
 Florence Beatrice Price
 Sonata in E Minor for piano (1932)
 Sergei Prokofiev
 Piano Sonata No. 1 in F minor, Op. 1 (1908).
 Piano Sonata No. 2 in D minor, Op. 14 (1912).
 Piano Sonata No. 3 in A minor, Op. 28 (1917).
 Piano Sonata No. 4 in C minor, Op. 29 (1917).
 Piano Sonata No. 5 in C major, Op. 38 (1923)/135 (rev. 1952–53).
 Piano Sonata No. 6 in A major, Op. 82 (1940).
 Piano Sonata No. 7 in B major, Op. 83 (1942) ("Stalingrad")
 Piano Sonata No. 8 in B major, Op. 84 (1944).
 Piano Sonata No. 9 in C major, Op. 103 (1947).
 Piano Sonata No. 10 in E minor, Op. 137 (1952) (unfinished).
 Piano Sonata No. 11 (unrealised).
 Violin Sonata No. 1
 Violin Sonata No. 2 (after Flute Sonata)
 Cello Sonata
 Maurice Ravel
 Violin Sonata
 Sonata for Violin and Violoncello
 Max Reger
 Seven Sonatas for Solo Violin, Op. 91
 Nine Sonatas for Violin and Piano
 Five Sonatas for Cello and Piano
 Three Sonatas for Clarinet and Piano
 Alexander Scriabin
 Piano Sonata No. 1
 Piano Sonata No. 2
 Piano Sonata No. 3
 Piano Sonata No. 4
 Piano Sonata No. 5
 Piano Sonata No. 6
 Piano Sonata No. 7 "White Mass"
 Piano Sonata No. 8
 Piano Sonata No. 9 "Black Mass"
 Piano Sonata No. 10
 Roger Sessions
 Piano Sonatas 1, 2, 3
 Solo Violin Sonata
 Dmitri Shostakovich
 Piano Sonata No. 1, Op. 12 (1926).
 Cello Sonata, Op. 40 (1934).
 Piano Sonata No. 2 in Bm, Op. 61 (1943).
 Violin and Piano Sonata, Op. 134 (1968).
 Viola and Piano Sonata, Op.147 (1975).
 Harry Somers
 Piano Sonata No. 1: Testament of Youth (1945)
 Piano Sonata No. 2 (1946)
 Piano Sonata No. 3 (1950)
 Piano Sonata No. 4 (1950)
 Piano Sonata No. 5 (1957)
Tim Souster
Sonata for cello, piano, seven winds, and percussion
Leo Sowerby
 Three sonatas for violin and piano
 No. 1 in A major
 No. 2 in B-flat major (1922)
 No. 3 in D major
Sonata for Cello and Piano (1920)
Sonata for Viola and Piano (also playable on clarinet)
Piano Sonata in D Major (1948, rev. 1964)
Sonata for Trumpet and Piano (1958)
Sonata for Clarinet and Piano (1944)
 Igor Stravinsky
 Piano Sonata
 Sonata for two pianos
 Stjepan Sulek
 Sonate Vox Gabrieli, for trombone and piano (1973–1978)
Germaine Tailleferre
 Sonata No. 1 for violin and piano (1921)
 Sonata No. 2 for violin and piano (1951)
 Sonata for harp (1953)
 Sonata alla Scarlatti, for harp (1964)
 Sonata for solo clarinet (1957)
 Sonata for two pianos (1974)
 Sonata for piano four hands (1975)
Boris Tchaikovsky
Sonata for Cello and Piano (1957)
Sonata for Violin and Piano (1959)
Two piano sonatas:
No. 1 (1944)
No. 2 (1952)
Sonata for Two Pianos (1973)
 Galina Ustvolskaya
Piano Sonata No. 1 (1947)
Piano Sonata No. 2 (1949)
Piano Sonata No. 3 (1952)
Piano Sonata No. 4 (1957)
Piano Sonata No. 5 (1986)
Piano Sonata No. 6 (1988)
 Heitor Villa-Lobos
Sonate-fantaisie No. 1 for violin and piano, Desesperança ("Despair") (1913)
Sonate-fantaisie No. 2 for violin and piano (1914)
Sonata No. 3 for violin and piano (1920)
Sonata No. 4 for violin and piano (1923)
 George Walker
 Piano Sonata No. 4
 William Walton
 Violin Sonata
Mieczysław Weinberg
Sonata for Bassoon Solo, Op. 133
Sonata for Clarinet (or Viola) and Piano, Op. 28 (1945)
Two sonatas for cello and piano:
No. 1 in C major, Op. 21 (1945)
No. 2 in C major (1958–59)
Four sonatas for cello solo
No. 1, Op. 72 (1960)
No. 2, Op. 86 (1965); second version, as Op. 121 (1977)
No. 3, Op. 106 (1971)
No. 4, Op. 140 (1986)
Sonata for double-bass solo, Op. 108 (1971)
Six piano sonatas
No. 1, Op. 5 (1940)
No. 2, Op. 8 (1942)
No. 3, Op. 31 (1946)
No. 4, in B minor, Op. 56 (1955)
No. 5, Op. 58 (1956)
No. 6, Op. 73 (1960)
Six sonatas for violin and piano:
No. 1, Op. 12 (1943)
No. 2, Op. 15 (1944)
No. 3, Op. 37 (1947)
No. 4, Op. 39 (1947)
No. 5, Op. 53 (1953)
No. 6, Op. 136bis (1982)
Three sonatas for violin solo:
No. 1, Op. 82 (1964)
No. 2, Op. 95 (1967)
No. 3, Op. 126 (1979)
Sonata for Two Violins, Op. 69 (1959)
Four sonatas for viola solo:
No. 1, Op. 107 (1971)
No. 2, Op. 123 (1978)
No. 3, Op. 135 (1982)
No. 4, Op. 136 (1983)
 Eugène Ysaÿe
 Six Violin Sonatas, Op. 27